Hamid Raza Khan Qadri was an Islamic scholar and mystic of the Barelvi movement.  Qadri was born in 1875 (Rabi' al-awwal 1292 Hijri), in Bareilly, India. His name at the time of his aqeeqah was Muhammad, as it was family tradition.

Lineage
Khan was the son of Ahmad Raza Khan, the son of Naqi Ali Khan, the son of Raza Ali Khan.

Education
He received his early education from his father. He completed his formal Islamic studies at 19. He was proficient in Arabic and Persian, as well as ahadith, fiqh, philosophy and mathematics.

Literary works
He translated Ad Daulatul Makkiya Bil Mad'datil Ghaibiya from Arabic to Urdu. It explains knowledge of the unseen in the life of Muhammad.

Khan's works include:
As Saarimur Rabaani alaa Asraaf Qaadiyani(Refuting Ahmadiyyah Sect)
Translation of Ad Daulatul Makkiyah
Translation of Kiflul Faqeeh Alfahim Fi Hukme Qirats addarahim
Haashia Mulla Jalaal
Naatia Deewaan
Fatawa Hamidiyah

Death
Khan died while praying on 17 Jumada al-awwal (23 May 1943). His funeral prayer was led by Sardaar Ahmed. His tomb is beside his father.

References

1875 births
1943 deaths
People from Bareilly
Indian Sunni Muslim scholars of Islam
Indian Sufis
Hanafi fiqh scholars
Barelvis
Islam in the United Kingdom
Indian people of Pashtun descent
Hamid